Because another league was in competition for the class of 1961 college stars, the American Football League draft for 1961 graduates was held in 1960, with a six-round telephone draft on November 21 and 22, that saw the Buffalo Bills select Auburn's Ken Rice as the overall first draft pick.  The draft was completed on December 5 and 6, with rounds seven through thirty.  The San Diego Chargers were still the "Los Angeles Chargers" in this draft, as their relocation was not announced until late January 1961.

Order

Boston Patriots draft picks

Buffalo Bills draft picks

Dallas Texans draft picks

Denver Broncos draft picks

Houston Oilers draft picks

New York Titans draft picks

Oakland Raiders draft picks

San Diego Chargers draft picks

1 American Football League All-Star.
2 Member of the American Football League All-Time Team.
3 American Football League MVP 
4 Member of the Pro Football Hall of Fame.

Notable undrafted players

See also
List of American Football League players
American Football League draft
List of professional American football drafts

References

1961
Draft
American Football League draft
American Football League draft